Florence V. "Frankie" Adams (1902–1979) was an American educator and writer. She had a long career at the Atlanta School of Social Work spanning 1931 through 1964. She is known for her social activism and as the author of Soulcraft: Sketches on Negro-White Relations Designed to Encourage Friendship and The Reflections of Florence Victoria Adams.

Biography
Florence Adams was born in Danville, Kentucky on July 9, 1902. In 1925 she graduated from Knoxville College. In 1939 she obtained her master's degree in education from New York University.

In 1931 Adams joined the faculty of the Atlanta School of Social Work. Adams influenced the curriculum and content of group work on a national level as a member of the Committee on Group Work of the American Association of Social Work.

In 1964 Adams retired from the Atlanta School of Social Work, now called Atlanta University.

From 1965 to 1967 Adams worked for Economic Opportunity Atlanta, Inc. and from 1968 through 1970 she worked with Project Head Start.

Adams died on August 29, 1979 in Atlanta, Georgia.

Publications
 Women in Industry (1929)
 Soulcraft: Sketches on Negro-White Relations Designed to Encourage Friendship (1944) 
 Some Pioneers in Social Work: brief sketches; student work book, with Whitney Young, Jr. (1957)
 The Reflections of Florence Victoria Adams, a history of the Atlanta University School of Social Work (published posthumously in 1981)

References

External links
Soulcraft: Sketches on Negro-White Relations Designed to Encourage Friendship
Frankie Adams Interview Transcript, 1976-1981 OH-31; T-32. Schlesinger Library, Radcliffe Institute, Harvard University, Cambridge, Mass.

1902 births
1979 deaths
African-American educators
Educators from Kentucky
African-American activists
People from Danville, Kentucky
Kentucky women in education
Activists from Kentucky
Black Women Oral History Project
20th-century African-American women
20th-century African-American people